Spuzzum First Nation is a Nlaka'pamux First Nations government located near Spuzzum, British Columbia.  It is a member of the Fraser Canyon Indian Administration, one of three tribal councils of the Nlaka'pamux people.  Other members of the Fraser Canyon Indian Administration are the Kanaka Bar, Skuppah and Nicomen First Nations (the Nicomen First Nation is also a member of the Nicola Tribal Association).

The Spuzzum First Nation reserve community and offices are located at Spuzzum in the lower Fraser Canyon, near the Alexandra Bridge and about 10 miles north of Yale.

Other Nlaka'pamux governments belong either to the Nicola Tribal Association or the Nlaka'pamux Nation Tribal Council.

History
The chief of the Spuzzum in 1858, Kowpelst ("White Hat") was one of the first to work Hill's Bar at the onset of the Fraser Canyon Gold Rush and was considered a "friendly Indian" during the Fraser Canyon War of that fall between the American miners and the upstream Nlaka'pamux of Camchin.  He was appointed as a magistrate by Sir James Douglas  During the Fraser Canyon War, a few thousand miners from bars farther up the canyon thronged at Spuzzum in terror of the upstream Nlaka'pamux, and some villages and food caches of the Spuzzum people were destroyed by armed parties of miners coming up from Yale, even though relations with the Spuzzum were considered friendlier than with their Nlaka'pamux kin farther upriver.

Reserve lands

Spuzzum First Nation has sixteen different reserves ranging greatly in size, and totaling . The largest two (Spuzzum 1 and 1a) stand on the West Bank of the Fraser River near the mouth of Spuzzum Creek.

Spuzzum people
Annie York
Carl Stromquist
Brenda Crabtree, a Spuzzum weaver at the Emily Carr University of Art and Design,

Chief and Councillors
Chief James Hobart, Councillor Diana Stromquist and Councillor Angie Mitchell were elected on June 13, 2020.

Treaty Process

Demographics
The 1878 Reserve Commission census found 237 people living in Spuzzum and neighbouring villages. The 1881 census listed only 146 people, but the number is dubious since that era (during construction of the Canadian Pacific Railway) would likely have been the community's peak population. Other estimates places the Indigenous population at the time around 400.

As of September 2015, the community had a registered population of 274, though only 46 lived on reserve.

Economic Development

Social, Educational and Cultural Programs and Facilities

See also
Thompson language

Further reading

References

Indian and Northern Affairs Canada - First Nation Detail

Nlaka'pamux governments
First Nations governments in the Fraser Canyon